The Electoral division of Macquarie was an electoral division in the Tasmanian Legislative Council of Australia. It existed from 1886 to 1999, when it was abolished since the Council was reduced from 19 to 15 seats. It took its name from former New South Wales Governor Lachlan Macquarie.

Members

See also
Tasmanian Legislative Council electoral divisions

References
Past election results for Macquarie

Former electoral districts of Tasmania
1999 disestablishments in Australia